Lawrence, Laurence, or Larry Richardson may refer to:

Religious figures
Laurence Richardson (bishop)  (1701–1753), Bishop of Kilmore
Lawrence Richardson (Blessed) (died 1582), Catholic martyr

Others
Lawrence Richardson Jr. (1920–2013), American Classicist and ancient historian
Lawrence Richardson (American football) on USA Today All-USA high school football team
Lawrence Richardson (academic) on List of Fellows of the American Academy in Rome 1896–1970
Larry Richardson (1927–2007), musician